Piano Concerto No. 2 in C minor may refer to:

 Piano Concerto No. 2 (Medtner)
 Piano Concerto No. 2 (Rachmaninoff)
 Piano Concerto No. 2 (Sauer)
 Piano Concerto No. 2 (Scharwenka)
 Piano Concerto No. 2 (Stanford)
 Piano Concerto No. 2 (Widor)